Shaikh Shamsud-Din al-Kermani or Kirmani (d. 1384/5) was a Sunni Muslim scholar. He wrote a commentary on Sahih Bukhari.

See also 
 List of Ash'aris and Maturidis

References

Asharis
Hadith scholars
Shafi'is
Sunni Muslim scholars of Islam
Persian Sunni Muslim scholars of Islam